Xylophagus ater is a species of awl fly belonging to the family Xylophagidae found in Central Europe and North Europe.

Description
The basal segment of the antenna is long, the length at least three times the width. In males the mesonotum is finely sculptured, shining, with two inconspicuous stripes of golden hairs. Females have three pollinose stripes on the mesonotum. The body length is 8 to 15 millimeters.

Biology
Larvae of Xylophagus ater are predatory. They feed on beetle larvae of the families Cerambycidae and Pyrochroidae which develop in dead branches of a wide variety of broadleaved trees.

References

Xylophagidae
Insects described in 1804
Diptera of Europe
Taxa named by Johann Wilhelm Meigen